Adana is a traditional Macedonian Oro, folk dance, from the town of Veles.

It is a man dance with medium fast movements. The dance in the beginning is danced with balancing and later when it in becomes faster is danced with jumping, kneeling down and turning around. The dancers in the beginning are holding shoulders and later when the dance gets faster they hold hands. They begin their dance in a position of a half circle.

See also
Music of North Macedonia

Further reading
Dimovski, Mihailo. (1977:91-7). Macedonian folk dances (Original in Macedonian: Македонски народни ора). Skopje: Naša kniga & Institut za folklor

External links

The music of the Adana folk dance on YouTube
Second sample of the music of the Adana folk dance on YouTube

Macedonian dances
Circle dances